Sebastián Eslava (born 15 March 1985), is a Colombian television actor, son of the famous bullfighter Pepe Cáceres. He is well known for his main role in The Girl as Manuel Monsalve.

Filmography

Film

Television

Awards and nominations

References

External links 
 

1985 births
Colombian male telenovela actors
Colombian male television actors
21st-century Colombian male actors
Living people